Temple Sedgwick Fay, M.D. (January 9, 1895, Seattle – March 7, 1963, Philadelphia) was an American neurologist and neurosurgeon. He is known for experimental use of extreme cold to treat patients with malignant tumors or head injuries.

Early career 
After undergraduate study at the University of Washington, he enrolled in the University of Pennsylvania School of Medicine, where the famous neurologist William Spiller became his mentor. After graduating in 1923, Fay became at the Philadelphia General Hospital a medical intern, an assistant to Spiller, an assistant to the famous neurosurgeon Charles Harrison Frazier, and then an instructor. During the years 1923 to 1929 Fay developed several new techniques and published several important papers. He was appointed in 1929 Professor and Head of the neurosurgery department at the Temple University School of Medicine. In 1931 he, along with R. Glen Spurling, William P. Van Wagener, and R. Eustace Semmes, started the Harvey Cushing Society, which was later renamed the American Association of Neurological Surgeons (AANS). Fay became in 1937 the 6th President of the Harvey Cushing Society.

Experimental treatments 
In 1938 he used a crude refrigerating apparatus for his experiments, with the assistance of George C. Henny, on cryotherapy for medical patients, for the control of cancer.

Fay developed the world's first systematic program of hypothermia for traumatic brain injury (TBI). He realized that "decreased intracranial pressure and improved utilization of oxygen by cerebral tissue" would help patients with TBI.

Late career 
In 1943 he left Temple University and did a considerable amount of work on "psychomotor patterning" exercises for children with learning disabilities, brain injuries, or cognitive disabilities at The Institutes for the Achievement of Human Potential.

Personal life 
Fay married Marion Priestly Button in 1923. They had four daughters. She was the 3rd great granddaughter of Joseph Priestley (1733-1804), the discovery of Oxygen and founder of the Unitarian Church in America.

References

External links

1895 births
1963 deaths
American neurosurgeons
Cryotherapy
University of Washington alumni
Perelman School of Medicine at the University of Pennsylvania alumni
Temple University faculty
20th-century surgeons